Britannia Parking is a parking management company based in Bournemouth, Dorset, United Kingdom. It is one of the largest car parking companies in England.

Operations 
The staff of approximately 150 employees administrates and manages over 600 car park facilities throughout the United Kingdom.

Britannia Parking is wholly owned by the directors and is a member of both The British Parking Association and the industry's Approved Operators Scheme.

The company's portfolio includes a number of multi-storey car parks serving large retail developments in locations such as Edinburgh, Birmingham, Newcastle, Milton Keynes, Romford and Southend on Sea. The company also operates multi-storey car parks within mixed-use retail and leisure schemes in locations such as Bristol, Weymouth and Plymouth.

Britannia manages car parks on behalf of supermarket chains like Waitrose and brewers including Greene King. They also provide ‘Park & Ride’ facilities for a number of large employers such as LV= , and several other large financial institutions. In 2019, britannia parking has released a payment app in cooperation with Scheidt & Bachmann.

References

External links
 

Transport companies established in 1992
Companies based in Bournemouth
Parking companies